The Agony of the Eagles (French:L'agonie des aigles) may refer to:

 The Agony of the Eagles (1922 film), a French silent film directed by Julien Duvivier
 The Agony of the Eagles (1933 film), a French film directed by Roger Richebé 
 The Agony of the Eagles (1952 film), a French film directed by Jean Alden-Delos